Kenneth Wayne Jennings III (born May 23, 1974) is an American game show host, author, and former game show contestant. He is the highest-earning American game show contestant, having won money on five different game shows, including $4,522,700 on the U.S. game show Jeopardy! which he currently hosts, sharing duties with Mayim Bialik. 

He holds the record for the longest winning streak on Jeopardy! with 74 consecutive wins. He also holds the record for the highest average correct responses per game in Jeopardy! history (for those contestants with at least 300 correct responses) with 35.9 during his original run (no other contestant has exceeded 30) and 33.1 overall, including tournaments and special events. In 2004, he won 74 consecutive Jeopardy! games before he was defeated by challenger Nancy Zerg on his 75th appearance. His total earnings on Jeopardy! are $4,522,700, consisting of: $2,520,700 over his 74 wins; a $2,000 second-place prize in his 75th appearance; a $500,000 second-place prize in the Jeopardy! Ultimate Tournament of Champions (2005); a $300,000 second-place prize in Jeopardy!s IBM Challenge (2011), when he lost to the Watson computer but became the first person to beat third-place finisher Brad Rutter; a $100,000 second-place prize in the Jeopardy! Battle of the Decades (2014); a $100,000 second-place prize (his share of his team's $300,000 prize) in the Jeopardy! All-Star Games (2019); and a $1 million first-place prize in the Jeopardy! The Greatest of All Time (2020).

During his first run of Jeopardy! appearances, Jennings earned the record for the highest American game show winnings. His total was surpassed by Rutter, who defeated Jennings in the finals of the Jeopardy! Ultimate Tournament of Champions, adding $2 million to Rutter's existing Jeopardy! winnings. Jennings regained the record after appearing on several other game shows, culminating with his results on an October 2008 appearance on Are You Smarter Than a 5th Grader?, though Rutter retained the record for highest Jeopardy! winnings and once again passed Jennings' total after his victory in the Jeopardy! Battle of the Decades tournament. In 2020, he once again faced off with and won against Rutter, as well as James Holzhauer, in a special primetime series, Jeopardy! The Greatest of All Time.

After his success on Jeopardy!, Jennings wrote about his experience and explored American trivia history and culture in his book Brainiac: Adventures in the Curious, Competitive, Compulsive World of Trivia Buffs, published in 2006. In September 2020, he signed on as a consulting producer of Jeopardy!, a job that included an on-air role reading categories. He held this role until the start of the show's thirty-ninth season.

Following Alex Trebek's death on November 8, 2020, Jennings hosted Jeopardy! as the first of a series of guest hosts. His episodes aired from January 11, 2021, to February 19, 2021. Following Mike Richards' exit early in the 2021–22 season, Jennings and Mayim Bialik were both named hosts; Jennings’ hosting duties were initially exclusive to the daily syndicated series until he was announced as host of Jeopardy! Masters in primetime in 2023. Jennings has split hosting duties in a permanent capacity alongside Bialik since the 39th season of the series.

Early life
Jennings was born on May 23, 1974, in Edmonds, Washington, a suburb of Seattle. His father was a lawyer employed internationally, and Jennings spent 15 years growing up in South Korea and Singapore where his father worked.

Upon returning to the United States, Jennings attended the University of Washington. Following two years as a volunteer missionary for the Church of Jesus Christ of Latter-day Saints, where he was assigned to serve in Madrid, Spain, he transferred to Brigham Young University in 1996. One of his roommates at BYU was author Brandon Sanderson. He also played on the school's quizbowl team, at one point serving as captain, and graduated in 2000 with a double major in English and computer science.

Streak on Jeopardy!
Before 2003, Jeopardy! contestants were limited to five consecutive wins. At the beginning of the show's 20th season (in 2003), the rules were changed to allow contestants to remain on the show as long as they continued to win. After this rule change, and until Jennings' run, the record winning streak was set by Tom Walsh, who won $186,900 in eight games in January 2004.

Jennings' run began during Jeopardy! 20th season with the episode aired on June 2, 2004, in which he unseated two-time returning champion Jerry Harvey, and continued into season 21. In that first episode, Jennings' entire winning streak nearly ended before it even began. The Final Jeopardy answer was, "She's the first female track & field athlete to win medals in five different events at a single Olympics." Jennings responded with "Who is Jones?" using only the last name of Marion Jones (who was not stripped of her medals until December 2007). Host Alex Trebek said, "We will accept that, in terms of female athletes, there aren't that many." If the response had not been accepted, Jennings would have finished in third place, and challenger Julia Lazarus would have won the game. Jennings' run was interrupted by the off-season break (July until September), 2004 Kids' Week, the Tournament of Champions (aired from September 20, 2004, through October 1, 2004), the 2004 United States presidential election (aired on Tuesday, November 2, 2004, pushing his weeks of episodes to air from Wednesday to Saturday) and the College Championship (aired from November 10, 2004, to November 23, 2004). As a result, he went the entire five months without a loss. He did not participate in the Tournament of Champions, as invitations are extended only to champions (4 wins or more) who have been defeated (with the exception of the winner[s] of the College Championship).

End of the streak
On November 30, 2004, Jennings' reign as Jeopardy! champion ended when he lost his 75th game to challenger Nancy Zerg. Jennings responded incorrectly to both Double Jeopardy! Daily Doubles, causing him to lose a combined $10,200 ($5,400 and $4,800, respectively) and leaving him with $14,400 at the end of the round. As a result, for only the tenth time in 75 games, Jennings did not have an insurmountable lead going into the Final Jeopardy! round. Only Jennings and Zerg, who ended Double Jeopardy! with $10,000, were able to play Final Jeopardy! as third-place contestant David Hankins failed to finish with a positive score after Double Jeopardy!

The Final Jeopardy! category was Business & Industry, and the clue was, "Most of this firm's 70,000 seasonal white-collar employees work only four months a year." Jennings appeared perplexed during the time allowed to write a response, while Zerg finished her response quickly. Zerg responded correctly with "What is H&R Block?" and wagered $4,401 of her $10,000, giving her a $1 lead over Jennings with his response still to be revealed. Jennings incorrectly responded with "What is FedEx?" and lost the game with a final score of $8,799 after his $5,601 wager was deducted from his score. After his response was revealed to be incorrect, the audience audibly gasped, and Nancy was shocked after finding out that she won. He was awarded $2,000 for his second-place finish, which gave him a final total of $2,522,700 for his Jeopardy! run. Zerg, whom Jennings called a "formidable opponent", finished in third place on the next show. The audience gave a standing ovation in honor of both contestants, and Trebek called Zerg a "giant killer" as Jennings embraced her.

It took a span of 182 calendar days to broadcast Jennings' 75 matches. His losing episode can be seen on the 2005 DVD release of Jeopardy!: An Inside Look at America's Favorite Quiz Show, released by Sony Pictures Home Entertainment.

Effect of the streak on Jeopardy!
Jeopardy! implemented some backstage changes during Jennings' run. Normally, players only get a short time to practice, but more rehearsal time was added so that the new players could get comfortable with the buzzers. Additionally, the person who managed the buzzer system was changed. In his book Brainiac, Jennings says that the consistency of the original manager's timing had given an increasing advantage to continuing players, and that the change made a noticeable difference in the second season that he was on the show. At one point, announcer Johnny Gilbert stopped announcing Jennings' total wins during the show's opening.

On December 1, 2004, the day after his defeat, Jennings made a guest appearance at the start of the broadcast, during which host Alex Trebek acknowledged his success and enumerated the various game show records he had broken.

According to the Nielsen TV National People Meter, Jeopardy! ratings were 22 percent higher during Jennings' run than they were during the same period the previous year. For several weeks of the winnings' streak, Jeopardy! was ranked as TV's highest-rated syndicated program. By the end of Jeopardy! 20th season several weeks later, the show had surpassed sister program Wheel of Fortune in the ratings, though Wheel still benefited from the streak in markets where Jeopardy! is its lead-in in the common scheduling tactic for both shows.

Media appearances and coverage during the streak
Jennings has received a good deal of American media coverage. After his 38th win on Jeopardy! during the summer break between tapings, Jennings made a guest appearance on Live with Regis and Kelly. There Jennings revealed that he had failed to qualify for Who Wants to Be a Millionaire, once hosted by Regis Philbin. During that guest appearance, Jennings said, "Jeopardy! is a man's game... it's not like Millionaire." However, he finally made it onto Millionaire a few years later during Terry Crews' only year as host.
Jennings appeared on the Late Show with David Letterman to present Letterman's "Top Ten List" ("Top Ten Ways to Irritate Alex Trebek"). He appeared again on the program on the night his final show was televised, in addition to interview segments airing that night on local late evening news programming and on Nightline. Barbara Walters selected Jennings as one of the "Ten Most Fascinating People of 2004" for her twelfth annual ABC News special, which aired on December 8, 2004. While on his media tour following his final game, Jennings taped a segment for Sesame Street. TV Guide featured a segment of "The Top Ten TV Moments of 2004", in which Jennings' loss placed third. On December 1, 2004, A&E aired an episode of Biography on Jennings and other Jeopardy! notables, including Frank Spangenberg and Eddie Timanus.

Jeopardy! tournaments

On December 28, 2004, Sony announced a 15-week, 75-show Jeopardy! Ultimate Tournament of Champions. It featured Tournament of Champions, College Championship, and Teen Tournament winners from the show's 21-year run, as well as over 100 five-time champions. Jeopardy! executive producer, Harry Friedman, explained, "The 2003 rule change, which allows Jeopardy! players to keep playing until they're defeated, raised the question about how other five-time champions might have played under this rule. This tournament is an opportunity to give those past champions another chance to shine." The field totaled 145 players including Jennings, who, unlike the other competitors, was automatically placed in the finals. The Ultimate Tournament of Champions offered substantial cash prizes; with a grand prize of $2 million to the winner, $500,000 for the first runner-up, and $250,000 for the second runner-up. Guaranteed prize money was offered to all contestants.

In the final round of the Ultimate Tournament, Brad Rutter decisively defeated Jennings and Jerome Vered, with respective final scores of $62,000, $34,599, and $20,600. Jennings won the $500,000 prize for second place, but as a result of the Ultimate Tournament, Rutter temporarily displaced him as the highest overall winner of money on game shows. Jennings has said he is still happy with his second-place finish.

From February 14–16, 2011, Jeopardys "IBM Challenge" featured the company's Watson against Jennings and Rutter in two matches played over three days. The winner of the competition was Watson, winning $1 million for two charities, while Jennings was second and Rutter was third, receiving $300,000 and $200,000, respectively. Jennings and Rutter each pledged to donate half of their winnings to charity.

This was the first-ever man-versus-machine competition in the show's history. At the end of the first episode, in which only the first match's Jeopardy! round was aired, Rutter was tied with Watson at $5,000, while Jennings was in third with $2,000. After the second episode in which the first game was completed, Jennings remained at third with $4,800 while Rutter at second had $10,400. The competition ended with Watson with $77,147, Jennings with $24,000, and Rutter with $21,600. Below his response during the Final Jeopardy! round, Jennings wrote on his screen "I for one welcome our new computer overlords." It was the first time Rutter had been defeated against any human player, although the defeat is not on Rutter's Jeopardy! official record, as the competition was deemed an exhibition.

Jennings wrote about playing against Watson for Slate.

In 2014, Jeopardy! aired a special five-week Jeopardy! Battle of the Decades tournament. Jennings made it to the finals along with Brad Rutter and Roger Craig. Jennings placed second, winning a $100,000 prize, and Rutter won first place, securing a $1-million prize.

In the 2019 Jeopardy! All-Star Games, with 18 former champions, Jennings was one of six captains, choosing 2015 Jeopardy! Tournament of Champions runner-up Matt Jackson and 2012 Jeopardy! College Champion Monica Thieu (who coincidentally eliminated Jennings in a 2016 episode of 500 Questions) to complete his three-person "Team Ken". Team Ken finished second to the team captained by Rutter, with Jennings winning $100,000, one-third of the $300,000 second-place prize. This brought his lifetime Jeopardy!-related winnings to $3,522,700.

In June 2019, Jennings said a future face-off between him and Jeopardy! record-holder James Holzhauer would be "irresistible."

A November 18, 2019 announcement by ABC named Jennings, Holzhauer, and Brad Rutter would return to Jeopardy! in a tournament to determine who is the "Greatest of All Time" scheduled to air on January 7, 2020. Jennings won the championship to be crowned with the "Greatest of All Time" title and a first-place prize of $1 million.

Outside Jeopardy!

Taking advantage of the notoriety of Jennings' losing Final Jeopardy! answer, H&R Block offered Jennings free tax planning and financial services for the rest of his life. H&R Block senior vice president David Byers estimated that Jennings owed about $1.04 million in taxes on his winnings. Also, BBDO created an advertisement for FedEx in the USA Today newspaper three days after his final game, stating "There's only one time FedEx has ever been the wrong answer" and congratulating Jennings for his streak.

In a 2011 Reddit AMA, Jennings recalled how in 2004 the Democratic politicians Chuck Schumer and Harry Reid unsuccessfully asked Jennings to run for the United States Senate from Utah. He commented, "That was when I realized the Democratic Party was f@#$ed in '04".

Jennings has written several books. Brainiac: Adventures in the Curious, Competitive, Compulsive World of Trivia Buffs details his experiences on Jeopardy! and his research into trivia culture conducted after the completion of his run. Ken Jennings' Trivia Almanac: 8,888 Questions in 365 Days, a hardcover book, is a compilation of trivia questions—with 3 categories and about 20 questions per day of the year. Maphead: Charting the Wide, Weird World of Geography Wonks explores the world of map and geography enthusiasts. Because I Said So! is a humorous examination of "the myths, tales & warnings every generation passes down to its kids". He also has written five books for his children's series, Junior Genius Guides. 

Jennings also had a column in Mental Floss magazine called "Six Degrees of Ken Jennings", where readers submitted two wildly different things that Jennings had to connect in exactly six steps, in the style of the Six Degrees of Kevin Bacon game. The column ran from November 2005 to the September–October 2010 issue.

According to Variety.com, Jennings and television producer Michael Davies teamed up as executive producers on a new game show format for Comedy Central. According to Comedy Central execs, it was planned that Jennings would co-host and participate. The series was planned to premiere late in 2005 or in the first quarter of 2006. As of April 2006, development had stalled, and the show's future remained uncertain. Jennings explained on his website that "Stephen Colbert's show was doing so well in its post-Daily Show spot that Comedy Central decided they weren't in the market for a quiz show anymore." As of mid-2006, he was still shopping a potential game show titled Ken Jennings vs. the Rest of the World.

Jennings appeared on The Colbert Report on September 13, 2006. During the interview, Colbert discussed Jennings' book, Brainiac, and mocked him for not knowing the number of pages in the book. After Colbert coined a word to describe intellectual nerdiness, "poindexterity", Jennings deliberated what the correct noun for "poindexter" was. Jennings noted, as he had done earlier that day on NPR's Talk of the Nation, that since his streak, people "seem to have an extra-hard trivia question" in case they run into him.

He also appeared twice on NPR's Wait Wait... Don't Tell Me! program. In his February 25, 2006, appearance on the "Not My Job" segment, he answered all three questions correctly, winning for a listener Carl Kasell's voice on that person's home answering machine. Jennings said, "This is the proudest moment of my game-show life." On June 1, 2013, he made his debut as a panelist on Wait Wait Don't Tell Me.

Jennings has written and edited literature and mythology questions for the National Academic Quiz Tournaments (NAQT), a quiz bowl organization. He has read questions as a moderator at the 2005, 2006, and 2009 NAQT High School National Championship Tournaments in Chicago.

Entertainment Weekly put his performance on its end-of-the-decade "best of" list, saying, "Answer: A software engineer from Utah, he dominated the quizfest for a record 74 shows in 2004, amassing $2,520,700. Question: Who is Ken Jennings?"

Jennings narrated the audiobook version of Alex Trebek's autobiography, The Answer Is.... His rendition was nominated for the Grammy Award for Best Spoken Word Album at the 63rd Grammy Awards.

Other game show appearances
Jennings appeared on the first two episodes of the NBC game show 1 vs. 100 on October 13 and 20, 2006, as a mob member. He incorrectly answered the question, "What color is the number 1 space on a standard roulette wheel?" as "black" instead of "red" in his second episode, eliminating him from the game. He left the show with $714.29, his share of a $35,000 prize shared among 49 mob members. He returned to the show for a special "Last Man Standing" episode aired on February 9, 2007. He was eliminated on the final question, which asked which of three people had been married the most times; he answered King Henry VIII, while the correct answer was Larry King. It was the first time Jennings had a chance at a rematch against rival Brad Rutter, who was also part of the mob and was eliminated before Jennings.

In 2007, Jennings was invited to be a contestant on the game show Grand Slam hosted by Dennis Miller and Amanda Byram, also a Sony Pictures production. It debuted on Game Show Network (GSN) on August 4, 2007, and featured 16 former game-show winners in a single-elimination tournament. Jennings, seeded second behind Brad Rutter, won the tournament and became the 2007 Grand Slam Champion after defeating Ogi Ogas (a second-round winner against Rutter) in the finals. He earned $100,000 for his victory.

Jennings was a contestant on an episode of Are You Smarter Than a 5th Grader? that aired on October 10, 2008, which held the possibility of exceeding Rutter's total game show winnings. After winning $500,000, enough to surpass Rutter's total, Jennings chose not to attempt the final $1-million question, which would have deducted $475,000 from his winnings if he missed it. As is customary on the show, Jennings was then shown the question to see what would have happened, and he provided the correct answer. Had he risked his winnings and correctly answered the question, he would have become the show's second $1-million winner.

From 2008 to 2009, Jennings appeared on GSN on Fridays for the trivia game Stump the Master, where home viewers submitted questions via the GSN website. Four callers were put on hold and Jennings selected from one of the categories. The caller for the category he picked came on the line and read the question. If Jennings didn't answer or was incorrect, the caller won $1,000 or more. When Jennings was right, the jackpot was increased by $1,000. All callers were given a small prize whether they participated on-air or not.

Jennings has appeared on multiple episodes of Doug Loves Movies, hosted by Doug Benson, and has won a few times.

Jennings also appeared on two other Sony Pictures Television game shows, Who Wants to Be a Millionaire, as a frequent expert for the lifeline "Ask the Expert", and also taped a pilot for the proposed 2009 CBS revival of Pyramid, titled Million Dollar Pyramid.

Jennings appeared on Millionaire in 2014 as a contestant during Guinness World Records Edition themed week, where he won $100,000 after deciding to walk away on his $250,000 question. If he had gone for it, he would have been right and would have won $250,000.

Jennings appeared on the second-season premiere of 500 Questions on May 26, 2016 and was eliminated on the fourth question by winter 2012 college champion Monica Thieu, leaving with no winnings. Jennings later teamed up with Thieu, along with Matt Jackson, in the Jeopardy! All-Star Games in 2019.

Jennings appeared on an episode of @midnight aired May 15, 2017, during the fourth season, which he won. As a result, he served as the funniest person on the internet for May 16, 2017.

An announcement in April 2019 named Jennings as one of eight recurring "Trivia Experts" for the new Game Show Network program Best Ever Trivia Show, hosted by Sherri Shepherd. The show premiered at 4:00 p.m. ET on June 10, 2019. He was also one of the six trivia experts on Best Ever successor, Master Minds, which premiered at 4:00 p.m. ET on April 6, 2020, with Brooke Burns as the host.

In November 2020, it was announced that Jennings would be one of the 3 chasers on the ABC revival of The Chase, hosted by Sara Haines with Rutter and Holzhauer as the other chasers, joined by Mark Labbett in season 2. Jennings left after the second season.

American Crossword Puzzle Tournament
Jennings won the rookie division of the American Crossword Puzzle Tournament in 2006. In his first time competing, Jennings placed 37th overall. He also served as the award's presenter, becoming the first contestant to present an award to himself. He has not competed in the tournament since.

Kennections
Jennings had a weekly trivia column, Kennections, in Parade magazine. In it, five questions were posed whose answers were connected to a mystery topic, which the readers had to guess. Parade ceased the quiz in early 2015, and removed links to archived quizzes in March 2015. Kennections now appears in the online version of Mental Floss magazine.

Tuesday trivia emails
Every Tuesday, beginning July 4, 2006, Jennings sent out an email containing seven questions. The seventh, a question asking what several items have in common, was designed to be Google-resistant. Subscribers responded with the answers to all seven questions and the results are maintained on a scoreboard on Jennings' blog. Every ten weeks, the respondent with the most seventh questions correct was awarded a signed copy of his newest book. After 800 quizzes, as of November 16, 2021, due to an ever-increasing amount of commitments related to Jeopardy!, book tours, and simply starting to run out of material for the seventh question, Jennings decided to discontinue this email.

Controversial tweets
Jennings is an active Twitter user, and some of his tweets have been subjects of controversy. On September 22, 2014, he received criticism after tweeting, "Nothing sadder than a hot person in a wheelchair." The tweet reignited controversy after resurfacing in 2020, which led to condemnation from noted disability rights activists such as Rebecca Cokley.

On November 10, 2015, he was criticized when he tweeted a joke about the death of Daniel Fleetwood, a lifelong Star Wars fan who died of cancer. Fleetwood's dying wish was to see Star Wars: The Force Awakens, fearing he likely would not live to see the film when it opened in theaters in December 2015. An online campaign was started on his behalf and his wish was granted only days before he died. Jennings said, "It can't be a good sign that every fan who has seen the new Star Wars movie died shortly thereafter."

Jennings again faced controversy when on May 31, 2017, he tweeted a joke involving Barron Trump, the youngest child of U.S. President Donald Trump. After 11-year-old Barron saw an image of Kathy Griffin holding a bloody Trump mask, he believed it was real and screamed. Jennings wrote, "Barron Trump saw a very long necktie on a heap of expired deli meat in a dumpster. He thought it was his dad & his little heart is breaking." After the tweet garnered controversy, Jennings said, "The joke doesn't mock Barron. It mocks using him for political cover." In August 2018, Jennings was criticized for his description of an elderly woman tweeting about her deceased son. When she tweeted about her son's love for the 1980s television character ALF, Jennings responded with "This awful MAGA grandma is my favorite person on Twitter."

In December 2020, Jennings offered an apology on Twitter for some of his past comments.

In January 2021, Jennings faced controversy again when his friend and podcast co-host John Roderick posted a Twitter thread where he discussed preventing his nine-year-old daughter from eating until she learned to open a can of baked beans using a manual can opener, which he approximated took six hours. The incident caused controversial past tweets to resurface in which Roderick made comments that were seen as using anti-semitic, homophobic, racist, and other derogatory language. Jennings defended Roderick, saying he was "a loving and attentive dad who ... tells heightened-for-effect stories."

The Wall Street Journal reported in August 2021 that Jennings was intended to be Alex Trebek's successor, but his social media controversies hurt his standing, with poor ratings from focus groups and Sony executives fearing his selection could cause backlash.

Omnibus podcast
On September 7, 2017, HowStuffWorks unveiled a new show entitled Omnibus, co-hosted by Jennings and John Roderick, frontman of the indie-rock band The Long Winters. They will pick topics they fear might be lost to history and discuss them.

LearnedLeague and online trivia 
Jennings has been an active member of the trivia app FleetWit, regularly playing in the live trivia races. As of March 2018, on average, he had answered 89 percent of questions correctly and has won over $2,000.

Jennings competed regularly in LearnedLeague under the name "JenningsK".  Ken's last active season was LL85 (May 2020), where he played in the A Rundle of the Laguna league and finished the season in 5th place.  LearnedLeague Season 86 started on August 19, 2020, and Sony announced Ken as the Consulting Producer of Jeopardy on September 3, 2020.  Jeopardy and Wheel of Fortune had halted live taping due to the COVID-19 pandemic in mid-March 2020 and resumed taping prior to September 2020.

Washington State honor
On March 3, 2020, the Washington State Legislature approved Senate Resolution 8704, congratulating Jennings for his achievements on game shows.

Endorsements
Jennings agreed to a deal with Microsoft to promote its Encarta encyclopedia software (which was later discontinued). He is also engaged in speaking deals through the Massachusetts-based speakers' agency American Program Bureau. In 2005, Cingular Wireless (now AT&T) featured Jennings in commercials portraying him as having lots of "friends and family" (coming out of the woodwork).

University Games produced a Can You Beat Ken? board game, in which players vie against each other and Jennings in an attempt to earn $2.6 million first. Each question in the game was asked to Jennings, and his answers, both correct and incorrect, are recorded on the cards.

Personal life
Jennings and his wife Mindy have a son, Dylan, born November 22, 2002, and a daughter, Caitlin, born November 13, 2006.

During his Jeopardy! winning streak, Jennings was a software engineer for CHG Healthcare Services, a healthcare-placement firm in Holladay, Utah.

Jennings is a member of the Church of Jesus Christ of Latter-day Saints.

Bibliography

See also
 List of notable Jeopardy! contestants
 Strategies and skills of Jeopardy! champions

References

External links

 
Omnibus podcast web site
 Jennings' February 2013 TED talk (video), "Watson, Jeopardy, and me, the obsolete know-it-all" 
 
 2006 IMNO Interview with Ken Jennings

1974 births
21st-century American male writers
21st-century American non-fiction writers
American bloggers
American game show hosts
American male bloggers
American podcasters
American software engineers
Audiobook narrators
Brigham Young University alumni
Jeopardy! contestants
Latter Day Saints from Utah
Latter Day Saints from Washington (state)
Living people
People from Edmonds, Washington
Utah Democrats
Washington (state) Democrats
Writers from Salt Lake City
Writers from Seattle
Jeopardy!